"Grandma's Hands" is a song written by Bill Withers about his grandmother. It was included on his first album Just as I Am (1971), and was released as a single, reaching number 18 on the Best Selling Soul Singles chart and 42 on the Billboard Hot 100. In Canada it reached No. 37 in the RPM Magazine charts. The song was produced by Booker T. Jones and also featured drummer Al Jackson Jr. and bassist Donald "Duck" Dunn from Booker T. & the M.G.'s.

Lyrics
Withers' maternal grandfather, Gracchus Monroe Galloway (1855–1937), had been born into slavery. In his youth, Withers attended church with his maternal grandmother, Lula (1868–1953), where she would sing and clap along with the hymns. He later said: "It was spontaneous singing, there was nothing programmed. People got up and sang and everybody would join in. It was my favorite kind of singing."

A central theme of the song is the protective and nurturing force of the hands, as expressed in the last verse:
"Grandma's hands used to hand me piece of candy.
Grandma's hands picked me up each time I fell.
Grandma's hands, boy they really came in handy
She'd say, "Mattie don't you whip that boy.
What you want to spank him for?
He didn't drop no apple core,"
But I don't have Grandma anymore,
If I get to heaven I'll look for
Grandma's hands.
Um, mm, mm."

Cover versions
The song has since been covered by many other artists, including Keb' Mo', Al Jarreau, Kristy Lee, Meg Mac, Merry Clayton, Livingston Taylor, The Staple Singers, Gladys Knight, Tony Orlando, Barbra Streisand, Gregory Porter, Will Downing, Take 6, Josh Garrels, Marti Pellow, Simply Red, Starsailor, Gil Scott-Heron, Everlast, Jeff Lorber, Paddy Casey in Today FM's Even Better Than The Real Thing, Willie Nelson and Ron Kenoly. It is also sampled for the hook of Blackstreet's "No Diggity" and "Shout" by Shout for England.

References 

Songs written by Bill Withers
1971 singles
Songs about old age
Barbra Streisand songs
Bill Withers songs
Sussex Records singles
1971 songs
Meg Mac songs